"The Green Council" is the ninth and penultimate episode of the first season of the HBO fantasy drama television series House of the Dragon. It first aired on October 16, 2022. It was written by Sara Hess, and directed by Clare Kilner.

The plot follows the aftermath of Viserys' death in King's Landing, starting with a discussion of Viserys' last words heard by Alicent in the previous episode regarding Aegon the Conqueror's dream, which she misinterprets as Viserys wanting their son Prince Aegon to be his successor. It ends with the coronation of Aegon, which leads to Rhaenys intruding the ceremony with her dragon Meleys.

The episode was met with mostly positive reviews, with critics praising the character development, pacing, tension, musical score, shock value, set-up for the finale, and performances, particularly that of Eve Best, Olivia Cooke, Tom Glynn-Carney, and Rhys Ifans.

Plot 
Queen Alicent tells her father, Ser Otto Hightower, the Hand of the King, that King Viserys' dying wish (which she misinterpreted) was that their son, Prince Aegon, succeed him rather than his daughter and chosen heir, Princess Rhaenyra. Otto delays publicly announcing the king's death and convenes a Small Council meeting. Alicent, Ser Harrold Westerling, and Lord Lyman Beesbury are stunned that Otto and other council members have secretly plotted to crown Aegon as king. When Beesbury protests usurping Rhaenyra, Ser Criston Cole kills him. Alicent refuses to allow Rhaenyra's murder to secure the throne. Harrold resigns as the Kingsguard's Lord Commander after defying Otto's command to assassinate Rhaenyra and her family. Criston later replaces Harrold. Meanwhile, Talya, Queen Alicent's lady-in-waiting, lights a candelabra in a window to secretly signal the king's death to Mysaria.

Otto and Alicent separately race to find and influence Aegon, who left the Red Keep. Otto sends Kingsguard brothers Ser Erryk and Ser Arryk Cargylls to search the city, while Criston and Prince Aemond assist Alicent, though Aemond wants to rule. In Flea Bottom, the Cargyll twins check a fighting arena Aegon frequents, where children, including Aegon's own bastard offspring, are forced into mortal combat as entertainment. An intermediary approaches the Cargylls, saying that Mysaria has Aegon and offers for Otto to meet with her. Mysaria, revealing she knows Viserys is dead, barters with Otto to end the child fighting pits in exchange for Aegon's location. The Cargylls find Aegon, but Criston and Aemond seize him by defeating Arryk, while Erryk withdraws to retrieve the Crown of Jaehaerys. With Aegon in her control, Alicent mandates that Rhaenyra and Daemon will be spared and exiled if they bend the knee. 

Otto coerces nobles into swearing fealty to Aegon; those resisting are imprisoned or hanged to warn anyone wishing to support Rhaenyra. Lord Larys Strong informs Alicent about the spy network within the Red Keep that includes Talya, and that Otto uses it for personal gain. Alicent allows Larys to eliminate the network's leader and shortly after, Mysaria's house is burned. Princess Rhaenys Targaryen refuses to support Aegon as king and remains a captive. Ser Erryk, aligning with Rhaenys, frees her.

At Aegon’s coronation in the Dragonpit, Otto announces Viserys' death and Aegon is crowned king by Cole before the city's cheering citizens. Rhaenys, separated from Erryk in the throng, enters the Dragonpit's lower caverns. Riding her dragon, Meleys, Rhaenys breaches the hall from below, causing mayhem and casualties. The cowering royal usurpers expect to be burned alive, but Rhaenys spares them and flees on dragonback to Dragonstone.

Production

Writing 
"The Green Council" was written by Sara Hess, marking her second episode as writer for the series, following "The Princess and the Queen".

The title of the episode refers to the Small Council, arranged secretly by Otto Hightower to secure Aegon's position as heir to the Iron Throne, which excludes Lord Lyman Beesbury and Queen Alicent, with the 'green' being a reference to the color of House Hightower.

Filming 
The episode was directed by Clare Kilner, making it her third directorial credit for the series after "King of the Narrow Sea" and "We Light the Way". The whole episode took place in King's Landing, which was filmed in the walled city of Plasencia, Cáceres, Spain.

Casting 

The episode stars Paddy Considine, Olivia Cooke, Rhys Ifans, Eve Best, Fabien Frankel, Sonoya Mizuno, Graham McTavish, Matthew Needham, Jefferson Hall, Tom Glynn-Carney, Ewan Mitchell, and Phia Saban. Despite his character's death in the previous episode, Considine remained included in the opening credits of the episode for appearing as Viserys' corpse. Therefore, this episode marks his final appearance, in addition to Bill Paterson, whose character, Lord Lyman Beesbury, died in the episode.

Reception

Ratings
An estimated 1.56 million viewers watched "The Green Council" during its first broadcast on HBO. Around 2.2 million viewers watched the episode across its four broadcasts on premiere night.

Critical response
The episode received mostly positive reviews from critics. On the review aggregator Rotten Tomatoes, it holds an approval rating of 85% based on 33 reviews, with an average rating of 7.8/10. The website's critical consensus said, "Beginning with conspiratorial whispers and ending with a roaring declaration of war, 'The Green Council' is a discomfortingly suspenseful kickoff to the long-awaited Dance of Dragons."

It received a rating of five out of five stars from Molly Edwards of GamesRadar+, who wrote in her verdict: "A season's worth of plotting and planning comes to a head in a stunning episode that's all about the greens, culminating in a dazzling ending that tees up the fire and blood to come, and four out of five stars from Michael Deacon of The Telegraph, Alec Bojalad of Den of Geek, and Jordan Russell Lyon of Ready Steady Cut. Deacon said that "the episode set us up expertly for whatever horrors lie in store during next week's season finale", Bojalad called it "another worthwhile step in an increasingly worthwhile story", while Lyon summarized the episode by saying "[Despite] there isn't much action, the tension between the characters, namely Rhaenys and Alicent, is excellent to see." Helen O'Hara of IGN gave it an "amazing" score of 9 out 10 and wrote in her verdict, "...this is an episode fuelled by fear and uncertainty, and particularly by Alicent's grief, worry and determination to protect her family. But there's plotting aplenty to keep us hooked, and actions that will have huge consequences for the Targaryen clan and Westeros as a whole." Jenna Scherer of The A.V. Club graded it with a "B+" and said, "'The Green Council' is a tense chess game of an episode, kicking off the power vacuum that we knew was coming the moment Viserys breathed his last." Erik Kain of Forbes called it "another brilliant episode of a show that is growing more brilliant with each passing episode," and further wrote in his verdict, "War is coming. Up to this point, House of the Dragon has expertly set the stage of the coming conflict, introducing us not only to the players of the game, but to the myriad fraught relationships, alliances and enmities that have led to the factions we now have arrayed before us." 

Several critics highlighted the character developments of Alicent, Otto, Aemond, and Rhaenys. Bojalad wrote about Otto's development: "He receives his supervillain glow up in this hour in superb, satisfying fashion", and about Rhaenys': "She has proven herself to be a logical thinker when it comes to the game of thrones." Deacon wrote about Aemond's "lust for power" and deemed it "an excellent development, as it opens up an exciting new front for future conflict." Particular scenes that were singled out by many critics include the conversation between Alicent and Rhaenys; the coronation of Aegon Targaryen; and the final scene of Rhaenys' intrusion in the middle of the coronation with her dragon Meleys. The opening scene depicting the situation in the Red Keep right after Viserys' death was also praised, particularly for Djawadi's musical score, which was compared to his previous work in the Game of Thrones episode "The Winds of Winter". Critics also praised the performances of Best, Cooke, Glynn-Carney, and Ifans. For Best, Scherer wrote, "Best's performance has been one of the most quietly commanding in the show, and this is another showcase of her talents; the temperament in her delivery is chilling. In addition, other aspects of the episode that received praise from critics are the pacing, tension, shock value, visual effects, and the set-up for the finale.

References

External links
 "The Green Council" at HBO
 

2022 American television episodes
House of the Dragon episodes